Glycoprotein endo-alpha-1,2-mannosidase is an enzyme that in humans is encoded by the MANEA gene.

References

Further reading